The Men's time trial C3 road cycling event at the 2016 Summer Paralympics took place on 14 September at Flamengo Park, Pontal. Thirteen riders from thirteen nations competed.

The C3 category is for cyclists with moderate upper or lower limb dysfunctions and includes those with cerebral palsy, limb impairments and amputations.

Results

References

Men's road time trial C3